Battlefield America is an American dance-drama film by Cinedigm. It was directed by Chris Stokes from You Got Served. The film stars Gary Anthony Sturgis, Tristen M. Carter, Marques Houston, Kida Burns, Zach Balandres, Camren Bicondova, Edward Mandell, and Kyle Brooks. It was released on June 1, 2012 in American theaters.

Synopsis
A young successful man, Sean Lewis finds himself with the task of turning a group of misfit kids into a team so they can compete in the underground dance competition circuit. With no dance ability, he hires a dance instructor to help him out, while also trying to juggle this responsibility with his work. He then found himself falling for Sara, who runs the community center for the kids.

Cast
 Marques Houston as Sean Lewis
 Mekia Cox as Sara Miller
 Gary Anthony Sturgis as Eric Smith Sr.
 Tristen M. Carter as Eric Smith
 Kida Burns as Tommy
 Russell Ferguson as Prime
 Christopher Jones as Hank "Shockwave" Adams
 Zach Belandres as Chu Ling
 Camren Bicondova as Prissy
 Edward Mandell as Marv
 Kyle Brooks as Roger
 David Michie as Glen Downing

Release
The film is set for a June 1, 2012 release in the United States. The film's first official trailer was posted on YouTube on February 7, 2012. A full theatrical trailer was posted on March 27, 2012.

Reception
The film has a rating of 8% on Rotten Tomatoes, based on 12 reviews and an average score of 2.8/10.

Soundtracks
Three mixtapes were released.
 Original Music From the Motion Picture: BATTLEFIELD AMERICA Soundtrack Mixtape Volume 1 Jahil Beats presents Mila J: JAPOLLONIA
 Original Music From the Motion Picture: BATTLEFIELD AMERICA Soundtrack Mixtape Volume 2 Jahil Beats presents MH Marques Houston
 Original Music From the Motion Picture: BATTLEFIELD AMERICA Soundtrack Mixtape Volume 3 Jahil Beats presents Tracy Irve

References

External links

2012 films
American dance films
American musical drama films
Films about dance competitions
2010s English-language films
2010s American films